888 Parysatis (prov. designation:  or ) is a stony background asteroid, approximately  in diameter, that is located in the central region of the asteroid belt. It was discovered by German astronomer Max Wolf at the Heidelberg Observatory on 2 February 1918. The S-type asteroid has a rotation period of 5.9 hours. It was named after the Persian Queen Parysatis from the Achaemenid Empire of the 5th century BC.

Orbit and classification 

Located in or near the region of the Eunomia family, Parysatis is a non-family asteroid of the main belt's background population when applying the hierarchical clustering method to its proper orbital elements. It orbits the Sun in the central asteroid belt at a distance of 2.2–3.2 AU once every 4 years and 6 months (1,629 days; semi-major axis of 2.71 AU). Its orbit has an eccentricity of 0.19 and an inclination of 14° with respect to the ecliptic. The body's observation arc begins at Vienna Observatory on 24 May 1906, almost 12 years prior to its official discovery observation at Heidelberg on 2 February 1918.

Naming 

This minor planet was named after the Persian Queen Parysatis of the Achaemenid Empire in the 5th century BC. She was the wife of the king Darius II, and the mother of Artaxerxes II of Persia, after whom the asteroid 831 Stateira was named. The  was also mentioned in The Names of the Minor Planets by Paul Herget in 1955.

Physical characteristics 

In the Tholen classification, Parysatis is a common stony S-type asteroid.

Rotation period 

In November 2006, a rotational lightcurve of Parysatis was obtained from photometric observations by Serbian astronomer Vladimir Benishek at Belgrade Observatory. Lightcurve analysis gave a well-defined rotation period of  hours with a brightness variation of  magnitude.

In April 2017, another lightcurve with a well-defined period of  hours and an amplitude of  magnitude was obtained by the Spanish group of asteroid observers, OBAS.

Diameter and albedo 

The Collaborative Asteroid Lightcurve Link adopts the results obtained by IRAS, that is, an albedo of 0.1392 and a diameter of 44.65 kilometers with an absolute magnitude of 9.51.

References

External links 
 Lightcurve Database Query (LCDB), at www.minorplanet.info
 Dictionary of Minor Planet Names, Google books
 Asteroids and comets rotation curves, CdR – Geneva Observatory, Raoul Behrend
 Discovery Circumstances: Numbered Minor Planets (1)-(5000) – Minor Planet Center
 
 

000888
Discoveries by Max Wolf
Named minor planets
000888
19180202